Adrian Gomboc (born 20 January 1995) is a Slovenian judoka. He is a member of the Hungarian community in Slovenia.

He competed at the 2016 Summer Olympics in Rio de Janeiro, in the men's 66 kg, in which he was fifth. He is the 2017 European silver medalist in the 66 kg division.

In 2021, he competed at the 2020 Summer Olympics in Tokyo, Japan, in the men's 66 kg and finished on 7th place.

References

External links
 
 
 

1995 births
Living people
Slovenian male judoka
Olympic judoka of Slovenia
Judoka at the 2016 Summer Olympics
Judoka at the 2020 Summer Olympics
European Games competitors for Slovenia
Judoka at the 2015 European Games
Judoka at the 2019 European Games
People from Murska Sobota
21st-century Slovenian people